Agostino Franciotti (1630–1670) was a Roman Catholic prelate who served as Apostolic Nuncio to Germany (1666–1670) and Titular Archbishop of Trapezus (1654–1670).

Biography
Agostino Franciotti was born Rome, Italy in 1630.
On 4 May 1654, he was appointed during the papacy of Pope Innocent X as Titular Archbishop of Trapezus.
On 10 May 1654, he was consecrated bishop by Marcantonio Franciotti, Cardinal-Priest of Santa Maria della Pace. 
On 10 Jul 1666, he was appointed during the papacy of Pope Alexander VII as Apostolic Nuncio to Germany.
He served as Apostolic Nuncio to Germany until his death in February 1670.

Episcopal succession
While bishop, he was the principal co-consecrator of:
Gianlucido Palombara, Bishop of Pesaro (1658);
Cesare Cancellotti, Bishop of Bisceglie (1658);
Anselmo Dandini, Bishop of Cervia (1662); and 
Ignazio D'Amico, Bishop of Patti (1662).

References

External links and additional sources
 
 

17th-century Roman Catholic titular bishops
Bishops appointed by Pope Innocent X
Bishops appointed by Pope Alexander VII
Clergy from Rome
1630 births
1670 deaths